The Humber Gap is a term for the geographic gap between the roughly north–south running line of hills formed by the Yorkshire Wolds and the Lincolnshire Wolds, formed by the west–east running Humber Estuary.

In the geological past the gap has formed part of an ice barrier due to glaciers during the ice age resulting in damming and formation of a 'Humber Lake', and also forms a geological division.

In modern times the gap has formed a natural choice for transport routes, such as the railways. The Humber Bridge also crosses the Humber close to the gap.

See also
Humberhead Levels: very heavily silted area formed west of the gap as a result of the damming of the gap, and subsequent lake formation
North Ferriby and South Ferriby, villages on the two sides of the Humber named after the ferries across the gap.

References

Geography of the East Riding of Yorkshire
Geography of Lincolnshire
Humber
Geology of England